Talmage is an unincorporated community in West Earl Township, Lancaster County, Pennsylvania, United States. Talmage is located between Brownstown and Leola.

References

Unincorporated communities in Lancaster County, Pennsylvania
Unincorporated communities in Pennsylvania